Chiemgauer Volkstheater is a theatre company based in Bavaria, Germany.

Theatre companies in Germany